Julie Madison is a fictional character appearing in American comic books published by DC Comics, commonly in association with the superhero Batman. The character first appeared in Detective Comics #31 (September 1939) and was created by Gardner Fox, Bob Kane, and Sheldon Moldoff. She is best known as being Batman's first significant romantic interest.

The character made her live-action debut in the 1997 film Batman & Robin, played by Elle Macpherson.

Publication history
Julie Madison first appeared in Detective Comics #31 (September 1939) and was created by Gardner Fox, Bob Kane, and Sheldon Moldoff.

Fictional character biography

Original version
Only four issues after Batman's own debut, Julie Madison first appeared in Detective Comics #31. She made her last appearance in the Golden Age of Comics in Detective Comics #49 (March 1941).

She is originally portrayed as an oft-imperiled socialite who is engaged to Bruce Wayne — and is unaware of his secret life as Batman. She fears that Bruce will never be anything but a spoiled, lazy playboy; she is fascinated with Batman, considering him her ideal man. In her first appearance, she is used as a pawn in the vampiric Monk's battle with the Dark Knight.

Detective Comics #40 established her as an actress. In this issue she and her costars are targeted by the deranged actor Basil Karlo (aka the original Clayface) who is angry for not being given the chance to star in a remake of a movie he had previously appeared in.

Julie makes her last appearance in the early series in Detective Comics #49. In this episode, the head of the film studio and his publicity agent get her to adopt the stage name "Portia Storme" (inspired by Portia of William Shakespeare's The Merchant of Venice and the fact that her last performance had "taken the world by storm"). Julie, meanwhile, ends her engagement to Bruce. The split is amicable and they remain on good terms. Batman and Robin intervene when Clayface escapes from custody and again goes after Julie. In the course of capturing the villain, she becomes the first female to don the Robin costume as part of a complicated deception.

Julie Madison reappeared in two World's Finest stories in the 1970s as Princess Portia, ruler of the fictional country of Moldacia.

Post-Crisis
The six issue mini-series Batman and the Monster Men by Matt Wagner, published in 2006, is set early in (the current post-Crisis version of) Batman's career, and re-introduces Julie Madison. This version of the character is a law student, and the daughter of Norman Madison, a failing businessman who borrows money from mobster Sal Maroni. Bruce Wayne cares deeply for Julie, but is reluctant to tell her the secret of his nighttime activities. Julie herself suspects that Bruce is hiding something from her.

Julie takes on further importance in Wagner's follow-up mini-series Batman and the Mad Monk. Like Monster Men, this series retells an early story from Batman's publishing history, his conflict with the vampiric villain, the Monk. As in the original, Julie sleepwalks into the Monk's lair where she is bitten by the vampire, becoming his thrall. The Monk attempts to manipulate Julie into signing over her father's finances to his supernatural cult. In the end, Batman saves Julie, but her father is killed by Maroni's thugs. Distraught, she leaves Bruce and Gotham and goes to Africa as a volunteer member of the Peace Corps.

In the Batman: Family miniseries, paparazzi ask Bruce Wayne if he is the "father of Julie Madison's baby".

Julie later makes a flashback appearance in Batman #682 as Darkseid's minions invade Batman's mind and distort his memories. In Batman's early days, she tells Alfred Pennyworth to inform Bruce she is leaving for Hollywood to try to make it as an actress; Batman later does not realize or recall that she has left.

She appears in a bathtub towards the end of Red Robin #11 as one of Ra's al Ghul's targets, identified as Bruce's first love, until she is rescued by Man-Bat, which shocks and scares her.

The New 52
In "The New 52" (a 2011 reboot of the DC Comics universe), Julie Madison debuts in the beginning of the "Savage City" storyline, the final act of "Zero Year". There she only appears in a flashback/dream sequence, in which she is dating Bruce, who is one of her classmates. She reappears in the last issue of the storyline, this time in the present time, as she has moved back to Gotham and wants to be reunited with Bruce. Alfred imagines what it would be like if Bruce and Julie got together and made a family, allowing Bruce to have a life beyond Batman. Bruce can't meet with Julie because he is busy with crime fighting, much to Alfred's displeasure.

In Batman (vol. 2) #43, Julie is the head of a clinic for underprivileged youth that Bruce Wayne is helping to finance and manage. After the events of Batman: Endgame - which sees Bruce having been left with no memories of his life as Batman after his last battle with the Joker - Bruce has begun a relationship with Julie and works for her in the clinic. Together, they visit Wayne Manor, which Geri Powers has purchased and returned to Bruce, only to be attacked by the Riddler, Mr. Freeze, and Clayface. In the course of their relationship, Julie reveals that her father was a former gunrunner who likely sold Joe Chill the gun that he used to kill Bruce's parents, but Bruce maintains that it doesn't matter, even expressing a desire to marry her. When Bruce remembers his past as Batman and concludes that he must restore his memories, Julie helps Alfred complete the process that will restore Bruce's memories of Batman at the cost of destroying all the memories he gained during his amnesia, accepting that Gotham needs Batman more than she needs Bruce and considering it appropriate in a twisted way that she should 'end' Bruce Wayne's life just as her father contributed to his original end by selling Chill the gun.

Other versions

Elseworlds
Julie Madison has been featured as a love interest for Batman in several Elseworlds stories:
The Gotham by Gaslight sequel Master of the Future;
In Batman: Dark Knight Dynasty, the "Dark Present" storyline begins with Bruce marrying Julie and ends with his death at the hands of Vandal Savage. At the time of Bruce's death, Julie is pregnant with his child, allowing the Wayne family to continue into the next storyline, "Dark Future", when Bruce's descendant, Brenna Wayne, faces Savage again in A.D. 2500;
The 1939 version of Julie appears in the Superman & Batman: Generations limited series, in which the heroes' adventures happen in real time. She is enjoying a date with Bruce Wayne at a technology fair when Lex Luthor tries to kill her with his Ultra Humanite robot.

Legends of the Dark Knight
In Batman: Legends of the Dark Knight #94, a group of people in an elevator discuss Batman. One of these is an 80-year-old Julie Madison, who recalls her encounters with him in the 1930s, a homage to the original series.

In other media
Julie Madison appeared in the 1997 film Batman & Robin, played by Elle Macpherson. Madison is Bruce Wayne's fiancée in the movie. She mostly appears in public with Bruce at events such as the unveiling of the giant telescope at the Gotham Observatory. Their relationship almost ends when Bruce, as Batman, falls under the spell of Poison Ivy. The novelizations for the film features an additional scene where Bruce, under the influence of Poison Ivy's love dust, breaks up with Julie in public. She is the only Batman love interest to not know about Bruce Wayne's secret identity.

References

Batman characters
Characters created by Bob Kane
Characters created by Gardner Fox
Characters created by Sheldon Moldoff
Comics characters introduced in 1939
DC Comics female characters
Fictional actors
Fictional socialites